Faridabad district is one of the 22 districts of the Indian state of Haryana with Faridabad city being the district headquarters. Haryana government has created a new Faridabad division which would cover the districts – Faridabad, Nuh and Palwal.

 it was the second most populous district of Haryana after Gurugram district.

Origin of name
The district is named after its headquarters, Faridabad city, which in turn is named after its founder, Shaikh Farid, the treasurer of Jahangir who built a town here. On Talab Road near Gopi Colony (Old Faridabad), his tomb or maqbara can still be seen.

History
The district lies in the cultural region of Braj. Tilpat (then "Tilprastha"), a town near the district's most populous city, Faridabad, was one of the five villages demanded by Pandavas to avert a disastrous war.

Sub-Divisions
The Faridabad district is headed by an IAS officer of the rank of Deputy Commissioner (DC) who is the chief executive officer of the district. The district is divided into 3 sub-divisions, each headed by a Sub-Divisional Magistrate (SDM): Faridabad, Ballabgarh and Badkhal.

Assembly constituencies
There are 6 Haryana Vidhan Sabha constituencies located in this district: Prithla, Faridabad NIT, Badkhal, Ballabgarh, Faridabad and Tigaon. All 6 are part of the Faridabad Lok Sabha constituency.

Economy
Faridabad was formerly Haryana's leading industrial city and a popular choice for setting up industry due to its location on the Delhi-Mathura Road. However, the emergence of Gurgaon as a powerhouse for industrial development in the state has led to its decline. The city is noted for its henna production in the agriculture sector while tractors, motorcycles, switch gears, refrigerators, shoes and tyres are other products made in the city.

Demographics

According to the 2011 census, Faridabad district has a population of 1,809,733. This gives it a ranking of 266th in India (out of a total of 640). Its population growth rate over the decade 2001–2011 was  31.75%. Faridabad has a sex ratio of 873 females for every 1000 males, and a literacy rate of 83%. Scheduled Castes make up 12.37% of the population.

At the time of the 2011 Census of India, 87.97% of the population spoke Hindi, 3.74% Punjabi, 2.66% Haryanvi and 1.47% Bhojpuri as their first language.

References

External links
Faridabad district website
Map of Faridabad district

 
Districts of Haryana
1979 establishments in Haryana